Sea Change is a novel by oceanographer James Powlik published in 1999. It is an environmental thriller about a harmful algal bloom.

1999 American novels
American thriller novels
Environmental fiction books
Delacorte Press books